I Am David Sparkle is a band from Singapore, formed in 2001 as an instrumental collective.

The band's name is a direct literal translation from the name of a famous Malaysian singing legend – M. Daud Kilau.

The band released their debut album This is the new in 2007, the single "Nosferatu Makes Me Nervous" in 2009, and the album swords in 2010.

Members
Currently made up of members who have all served time in various acclaimed indie, punk and hardcore acts over the last 12 years in Singapore.
Current
Amran Khamis - Guitars / Effects / Keys
Johnny Mo - Guitars / Beats / Keys
Farizwan Fajari - Bass
Zahir Sanosi - Drums / Percussion
Adel Rashid - Guitars

Past
Prof. Edryan Hakim - Electric Wizard-ry (2001–2003)
Redzuan Hussein - Keys/Noise Effects (2002–2004)
Nick Chan - Guitars / Beats / Production (2007)
Yamani Ismail - Bass (2001–2007)

Discography

This Is The New
 Released:  November 2007
 Recorded and produced Mr MUON (2006–2007)
 Written, arranged & performed by: I Am David Sparkle

Apocalypse of Your Heart EP
 Released:  November 2006
 Recorded by: Leonard Soosay (2005)
 Written, arranged & performed by: I Am David Sparkle

Awards
 Best Alternative Act (Motorola SUPER-StyleMIX 2007)

Performances
I Am David Sparkle has played at various shows/festivals such as:
Global Gathering Malaysia, 27 Oct 2007
Good Vibrations Festival, 19 Feb 2007
KL Jam Asia, 11 Feb 2007
Off Beat @ Home Club, 26 Jan 2007
Bar None's 'Monday Sessions', 27 Nov 2006
BayBeats 2005
Others include ‘Tesseract’, ‘RNDM’ and ‘Death of the Vocalist’.

Reviews
"The group creates slow-burning soundscapes reminiscent of Explosions in the Sky, Godspeed You Black Emperor and Mogwai's, but less dramatic... Layers upon layers of guitars create a textual mood that ranks with some of the best post-rock sounds out there." - IS Magazine, 26 Jan 2007 [Singapore]

"...haunting and utterly unforgettable." - TODAY,  17 Feb 2007 [Singapore]

References

External links
 Myspace

Singaporean post-rock groups
Musical groups established in 2001
Singaporean rock music groups
Experimental musical groups
I Am David Sparkle